Triuris is a genus in the family Triuridaceae. It consists of species that are small and achlorophyllous, occurring in tropical Mexico, Guatemala, and northern South America.

 Triuris alata Brade - Rio de Janeiro, Yucatán Peninsula
 Triuris brevistylis Donn.Sm. - Yucatán Peninsula, Guatemala
 Triuris hexophthalma Maas - Guyana
 Triuris hyalina Miers - Brazil, Suriname, Colombia, Venezuela

References

Pandanales genera
Parasitic plants
Triuridaceae